The Academy of Motion Picture Arts and Sciences awards the John A. Bonner Medal of Commendation upon the recommendation of its Scientific and Technical Awards Committee. The medal is awarded with a citation reading "in appreciation for outstanding service and dedication in upholding the high standards of the Academy." The inaugural Medal of Commendation was given at the 50th Academy Awards in April 1978, and is given irregularly.

Naming
The medal was originally called the Medal of Commendation but was named in 1997 for the American sound engineer John A. Bonner who served for several years as the governor of the academy's Sound Branch; and as chair of its Scientific and Technical Awards Committee and its Theater Sound Inspection Committee. Bonner had also been the director of special projects at Warner-Hollywood Studios. The president of the Academy of Motion Picture Arts and Sciences, Arthur Hiller said that no person "...better represents the concept of service and dedication to the Academy" than Bonner and that he was "...dedicated to the Academy for more than 30 years. His devotion to the Academy's Samuel Goldwyn Theater was legendary and his commitment to the Academy was simply extraordinary."

Recipients
1977 (50th) – Gordon E. Sawyer and Sidney Paul Solow
1978 (51st) – John O. Aalberg, Linwood G. Dunn, Loren L. Ryder and Waldon O. Watson
1979 (52nd) – Charles G. Clarke and John G. Frayne
1980 (53rd) – Fred Hynes
1985 (58th) – John H. Whitney, Sr.
1986 (59th) – E. M. (Al) Lewis
1990 (63rd) – Roderick T. Ryan, Don Trumbull and Geoffrey H. Williamson
1991 (64th) – Richard J. Stumpf and Joseph Westheimer
1992 (65th) – Petro Vlahos
1994 (67th) – John A. Bonner
1996 (69th) – Volker Bahnemann and Burton "Bud" Stone
1997 (70th) – Pete Clark
1998 (71st) – David W. Gray
1999 (72nd) – Edmund M. DiGiulio and Takuo Miyagishima
2000 (73rd) – N. Paul Kenworthy, Jr.
2001 (74th) – Ray Feeney
2002 (75th) – Curt Behlmer and Richard Glickman
2003 (76th) – Douglass Greenfield
2005 (78th) – Don Hall
2006 (79th) – Richard Edlund
2007 (80th) – David Inglish
2008 (81st) – Mark Kimball
2010 (83rd) – Denny Clairmont
2011 (84th) – Jonathan Erland
2012 (85th) – Bill Taylor
2013 (86th) – Charles "Tad" Marburg
2018 (91st) – Curtis Clark

See also
 :Category:Recipients of the John A. Bonner Medal of Commendation

References

External links

Sci-Tech Awards - Academy of Motion Picture Arts and Sciences

1977 establishments in California
Honorary Academy Awards
Audio engineering
Awards established in 1977